The Fahey–Murray ministry (1992) or First Fahey–Murray ministry or First Fahey ministry was the 82nd ministry of the New South Wales Government, and was led by the 38th Premier of New South Wales, the Honourable John Fahey, representing the Liberal Party in coalition with the National Party, led by the Honourable Wal Murray, .

Composition of ministry
The term of this ministry is just nine days, from 24 June 1992, when Fahey was elected to succeed Nick Greiner as Leader of the New South Wales Liberal Party and hence became Premier; until 3 July 1992, when Fahey reconstituted the ministry. Ministers are listed in order of seniority.

 
Ministers are members of the Legislative Assembly unless otherwise noted.

See also 

Members of the New South Wales Legislative Assembly, 1991–1995
Members of the New South Wales Legislative Council, 1991–1995

Notes

References

 

! colspan="3" style="border-top: 5px solid #cccccc" | New South Wales government ministries

New South Wales ministries
1992 establishments in Australia
1992 disestablishments in Australia
Cabinets established in 1992